The DR 130 family of locomotives comprises the DR Class 130 (DBAG Class 230), DR Class 131 (DBAG Class 231), DR Class 132 (DBAG Class 232 as well as Classes 233, 234 and 241 produced through modifications) and DR Class 142 (DBAG Class 242), in USSR locomotive called TE109 (DBAG 230/1/2) and TE129 (DBAG 242).

They were produced in the Soviet Union in Luhansk, Ukraine from the 1970s onwards, and were imported into the GDR. After the reunification of Germany the Deutsche Bahn (DBAG) inherited them and continue to make use of them mainly as heavy freight locomotives.

Nicknamed Ludmilla, over 700 units were produced between 1970 and 1982. Two of these machines are classed as works vehicles with the designation Class 754.

History 

During the 1960s the East German government decided to focus on diesel traction. Due to RGW guidelines the GDR had to stop their production of diesel-hydraulic locomotives with more than 2000 HP.  Instead GDR imported heavy-duty engines from the USSR, starting with the a version of the M62 (the famous "Taiga drum") known as the V200 (later Class 120; Class 220 after reunification) for freight trains.

Unfortunately the soviet industry could not provide an electric heating feature, therefore the engines were restricted to freight trains for which their gearing was too high.

When in 1972 an electric heating system was available, two prototypes 130 101 and 130 102 were constructed. This class became the backbone of GDR diesel traction. Later six  DR Class 142 units were produced in 1977, but due to the planned electrification of many major lines such powerful engines were not necessary any more.

After reunification Classes were renumbered according to Germany practice, thus as mainline diesels the prefix "2" was necessary: the Class 130 was renumbered to DBAG Class 230 and Class 131 to DBAG Class 231; both were soon pulled out of service. The renumbered DBAG Class 232 are still in service and have taken over many freight services in Western Germany.

The class 241 without electrical heating was only designed for heavy good trains up to 4000 metrical tons between Germany and Belgium or Netherlands.)

Design 

The locomotives are constructed on a steel frame with attached carbody; units with electric heating are  longer due to the extra space requirements.

The two 3-axle bogies pivot on a central pin, with primary suspension being of the coil spring type with additional dampers. The power transmission is electric. In the original Class 130 a 16-cylinder turbo-charged diesel engine created electric energy for the nose-suspended DC traction motors. (Some rebuilt locomotives have 12-cylinder engines).

Due to construction and the electric power transmission the class 232 locomotives are very heavy. The axle load of 20.3 t allows usage only on main lines.

The power for the unmodified classes is powered by a direct-injection, 16-cylinder, four-stroke, Diesel engine (of type 5D49) delivering when turbocharged  The fuel capacity is 6000 litres, additionally 1100 litres of engine oil is used.

The diesel engine of the V 300 had significant initial problems; the original crankshaft was made from ductile cast iron but was prone to cracking, particularly after the winter. The cast cranks were replaced with forged versions providing running for 20,000 hours, but initially they suffered from low surface hardness; this problem was solved by nitriding the surface, and by locally heating the surface with a CO2 laser (see annealing).

The engine drives an AC generator whose current is rectified by six-way rectification using 240 diodes. Traction motor power control is achieved via the engine (i. e. using the throttle) and by thyristor 'choppers'.

Classes

DR Class 130 / DBAG Class 230

The class was unveiled at the Leipzig Spring Fair in 1970 as 300 001 V, the locomotives were trialled by the VES-M in Halle as the Class 130, and this designation was carried into service.

The first locomotive was given to the Leipzig Hbf-South railway, and it was here that the nickname Ludmilla was given to these machines.

All but a few locomotives had their top speed reduced to  - these locomotives ran as the subclass DR 131.1.

The two test machines for electric heating were given the operating numbers 130 101 and 102, being structurally most similar to the main tranche of Class 130s.

After reunification the machines became members of Class 230, previously this designation had applied to the single DB Class V 200 variant also known as V 300.001

DR Class 131 / DBAG Class 231
When it became evident that the locomotives would be used mainly for freight due to the lack of electric heating, the Reichsbahn ordered the next 76 locomotives with maximum speed of only  (without electric brake). These 76 machines were classified as Series 131. After 1990 the Adtranz company built new "Caterpillar 3606"-engines with 1850 kW (2500 HP) in four 231.

DR Class 132 / DBAG Class 232 and variants

The development of the DR Class 132 was spurred by Voroshilovgrad Locomotive Works' new capability to provide locomotives with electric heating.  

They were always stationed at the test centre VES-M Halle, and when incorporation into the new Deutsche Bahn came they were classed as the 754 series.

The Class 132s entered service in 1974, 709 locomotives of this class were built.

Under the Deutsche Bahn numerous locomotives of this class were rebuilt:

DBAG Class 232.9
Some of Class 234 which had been upgraded to  operations were subsequently returned to  top speed operation.

DBAG Class 233 
These locomotives were renovated and remotorised with Kolomna 12 D 49 M engines, and other more minor improvements: A replacement engine for the 232 series was sought because the engine was reaching its wear limit. Different new engines were tested: a Caterpillar engine, a MaK engine and the Russian 12 D 49 M. For cost reasons and because the Russian engine could be used with the fewest modifications the 5D49 was selected. However, the Russian producer proved no longer capable of supplying this engine, as a result an engine largely similar to the 5D49 but with only twelve cylinders was supplied. This engine can have sets of cylinders turned off to save fuel at low workloads. By 2003, 65 locomotives had been rebuilt.

DBAG Class 234
Converted for operation at  using higher speed bogies found in the scrapped Class 130s. 64 examples were made.

DBAG Class 241
The top speed was reduced to only .

DR Class 142 / DBAG Class 242
However, it had been decided at the political level that the main lines would be electrified, thus there would be no need in future for such a powerful locomotive, as a result no further machines were built.

Usage 

During GDR times the class 132 pulled everything that was fast or heavy such as express trains on non-electrified lines or coal or lime trains of 1800 to 2200 tonnes in weight. Due to the higher axle load and weight their use was not as flexible as the DR Class 118 and DR Class 119

After the Berlin Wall came down in 1989, these locomotives would take their trains outside the former GDR, with Hamburg, Kassel, Nuremberg and Kiel being destinations. With the merger of the two German train companies in 1994 the Ludmillas were seen even further afield – taking over many of the workings of the DB Class V 160 family – due to their higher power.

After restructuring of DBAG the Class 232 locomotives were assigned to DB Cargo (now Railion) for freight services. Class 232 locomotives could be seen all through Germany and also operating in the Netherlands, the higher-power Class 241 are mainly used on heavy (up to 4000 metrical tons) freight trains between germany and Belgium or the Netherlands. These were replaced in the Netherlands in 2006 by Baureihe 189 locomotives. The higher-powered Class 242 also worked extremely heavy (up to 3600 metrical tons) oil trains between Rostock Port and Schwedt Refinery "PCK". Five locomotives are now in private ownership, the sixth locomotive, the 242 006, was demolished in 2009 in Cottbus for recycling. The 4000 HP-engines of the 242 002 – 242 005 was changed, now this four locomotives have a Kolomna 12D 49-engine with 3000 HP.

Some intercity services (such as the Berlin-Warsaw express) are still provided by DB Fernverkehr using the higher speed Class 234s. These were later replaced by Polish EuroSprinter locomotives. Four locomotives was used for Intercity´s between Ulm and Lindau (Lake constance).

The locomotives are still (2016) used in Germany, Poland, Romania and Hungary.

Retirement
The Class 230s were the first of the family to be withdrawn, next went locomotives of the type 231, since without train heating they had no use. A few of these classes were acquired by private companies including EBW, others are in museums.

The 242 series were also withdrawn from DBAG usage, but have since entered private use.

As of February 2009 locomotives of Class 232 with its variants 233, 234 and 241 are still in main line work.

Variants 
Similar engines were produced for other Soviet bloc countries:
 Bulgaria: 07, similar to class 131.
 Czech Republic, Slovakia: T679.2 similar to class 132.
 USSR: TЭ109, double engines 2TЭ109, TЭ125, TЭ129.

See also
 Numbering scheme of the German railways

Notes

References

Literature 
 
 
 
 

Franz Rittig, Manfred Weisbrod: Baureihe 232 – Die berühmte Ludmilla (= Eisenbahn Journal Extra. Ausgabe 2 / 2012). Verlagsgruppe Bahn, Fürstenfeldbruck 2012, ISBN 978-3-89610-363-5.

External links 

 br232.com Stock lists and work histories of entire class family br232.de, see also br232.de 
 Triebfahrzeug-Lexikon : Die Baureihe 232 Brief description and technical information schiebebuehne.de
 Br 132 / 232 gallery @ Trainspo
 Br 130 series @ Trainspo
 Pictures in the European railway gallery (via railfaneurope.net):
BR232
BR233
BR234
BR241
BR234.304 in unique Turquoise Passenger Livery
BR130/131 in Reichsbahn livery (mostly post re-unification)
 DR Class 130 - the ludmilla

Railway locomotives introduced in 1973
Diesel-electric locomotives of Germany
Deutsche Reichsbahn (East Germany) locomotives
Deutsche Bahn locomotives
Co′Co′ locomotives 
Luhanskteplovoz locomotives
Standard gauge locomotives of Germany